OOglies is a stop-motion animated children's television series produced by BBC Scotland for CBBC. The show involves short humorous sketches with household items and food, virtually all of which have googly eyes stuck on, hence the show's title.

The show first aired on 10th August, 2009 on both CBBC and BBC HD. The commission was for two series of 13 shows, each 15 minutes long. The shows were produced in a block over five months in Glasgow. Voices are provided by Tim Dann, Peter Dickson and Shelley Longworth. The series was created and written ("set free") by Nick Hopkin, Tim Dann and Austin Low. The show returned in 2015 as OOglies Funsize.

Recurring gags

There are groups of characters who appear with similar gags multiple times, and sometimes the characters meet each other.
Episodes begin with a mock safety announcement (voiced by Peter Dickson): "Attention all humans. The stunts you are about to witness have been performed by trained OOglies. Under no circumstances should children or silly adults attempt to do any of the actions you see in the programme." (with "It's time for OOglies!" added after it for Funsize)

 The Playful Grapes and Melonhead – A group of green grapes try out an activity (such as sliding or skipping) until a clumsy watermelon tries to join them, usually ending up squashing the grapes. Usually the pre-opening sketch in Series 1.
 Boo Potato – a sprouting potato often lays "traps" for a random OOglie character to come and observe. When it is close enough, the potato jumps out with a "BOO!" and scares the OOglie in a comical fashion, resulting in them falling apart or breaking.  Usually the pre-opening sketch in Series 2.
 Strawberry Lovers – A pair of amorous strawberries meet across a gap in the counter and the male lover tries to get across, but is always unsuccessful and often ends up being squashed.
 The Cherry-aiders – Four cherries make up an air ambulance team using a flying mixer and go to help another OOglie who is broken by wrapping them up in bandages, normally causing more problems for the injured OOglie.
 Lonely Sprout – A Brussels sprout tries to join in with or save other OOglies but ends up failing as no one seems to like him, referencing how sprouts are relatively disliked by children.
 Stunt Tomato – A tomato in a cape and mask tries to do impressive tricks for three cherry tomatoes, but always ends up getting injured.
 Slippery Nana – A Banana skin tries to do something but keeps slipping over, usually breaking objects around it. In the last episode, he comes across a female banana skin and they go out the cat flap together.
 Racey Bacon and Mr. Bun – A slice of bacon is running away from a bun and hides somewhere disguising itself as something else (e.g. the centre of a flower or a fish finger). It escapes from the bun, but it ends up backfiring (such as being sprayed with water or covered in ketchup, respectively).
 Zombie Vegetables – An OOglie food is tossed into a bin where a rotting Parsnip and Potato live. Although seemingly menacing at first, the "zombies" quickly show their friendship to newcomers through flatulence, which often backfires on them when their "visitors" try and copy them.
 The Stapler Dogs – A stapler pranks three dogs (staple removers) by getting them to jump off their shelf, such as giving them a bowl of staples then throwing some off the shelf.
 The Baby Blocks – Three toy blocks, a blue cube, a pink cylinder and a yellow triangular prism are babies, and go off to investigate something which ends up scaring them with a loud noise, causing them to cry and run back to the safety of their toybox.
 The Fruit Bunch and Devious Blender – An Orange sees something interesting and tells a Banana, an Apple and a Pear about it. They go over to investigate, but find out that it is in fact a villainous blender in disguise. After throwing off his disguise, the blender mixes them into a smoothie.
 Laser Mouse – A short-tempered computer mouse moves around by shooting a laser beam in front of himself and following it. He comes across an object he cannot get through due to only being able to move in straight lines, so he uses the laser to make a doorway. This usually causes whatever he burned through to cave in on top of him.
 Zip Face and Pencil – a cheeky pencil escapes from his pencil case, who wakes up and tries to recapture him. The pencil, however, uses a sketchbook to draw pictures that come to life and bring comical harm to the case.
 The Scramblers – a trio of motor biking eggs who attempt daredevil stunts (with a slab of Red Rind Edam Cheese as a ramp). However, one of the eggs has training wheels on his bike, and it is usually him who attempts the stunts last and, somehow, ends up smashing himself and his bike. In the penultimate episode, he finally manages to complete a stunt without smashing himself.
 The Cheeky Carrots and Torch – a torch tries to get some sleep in a basement; but whenever his light is off, a band of nocturnal carrots get up to mischief in the darkness, until the torch puts them straight.
 Sugar Cube – a small sugar cube goes sledging with husky dog tea bags, until she becomes knocked off her "sledge" (a spoon) and winds up coming into contact with water where she melts, much to her dogs' displeasure.
 Strictly Come Grating – similar to "Strictly Come Dancing", a male grater dances with various female contestants (a carrot, an orange, a corn on the cob) until the female dancers are accidentally grated by their partner.
 Alarming Clock – a cheeky alarm clock disturbs a sleeping OOglie (such as a balloon) by her noisy ring, which usually backfires on the clock herself.
 The Party Box Gang – a group of Christmas Decorations play a needless game of musical chairs in their box. When one decoration is left out, it finds a way to acquire a chair from another competitor.
 Grumpy Ball and Bouncy Ball – a small red, grumpy basketball is constantly annoyed by his brother, a cheerful, green bouncy ball. Usually, Grumpy finds a way to stop Bouncy's bounciness.
 Bonkers Conkers – a pair of conkers make countless attempts to knock the others off its end of rope – resorting to armour and ray guns.
 The Inquisitive Mushrooms – a tray of mushrooms (who only communicate by a neanderthal-like "oogah") come across strange and interesting items for them to explore and demonstrate to one another, such a computer scanner or keyboard.
 Frantic Fan – A large revolving fan, who is normally reading a book gets annoyed by various OOglies (whom he tries to blow away) or is used as a "wind machine" for various stunts.
 The DIY Doughnuts – two doughnuts (one sugar-covered, the other pink) are builders given orders by their Foreman (a larger chocolate doughnut) for various jobs. Unfortunately, they wind up literally making a mess of things, much to their Foreman's annoyance, and his anger usually causes him to get involved in the mess as well.
 Meatball and the Pasta Olympics – a small meatball tries to overcome her fears when participating in the OOglies' answer to the Olympics, often smashing herself or some other hapless food product. In the final episode, while trying to throw a hammer she accidentally flings herself into the audience and decides to watch the games instead.
 Two pineapple rings try to wake up their "dad" – a whole pineapple – with various loud devices, which usually backfire on the two rings, leaving the pineapple to sleep.
 A quiet, Spanish cactus tries to avoid fragile OOglies (such as a balloon or dartboard) but always looses her spines when given a nasty shock, bursting the former OOglie.
 A high-speed strip marker races around the household, leaving behind his long yellow trail of sticky tape. At one point, he runs out of tape and gets a much bigger roll.
 A pepper shaker goes about spraying its contents on various OOglies, but suffers the aftermath from their explosive sneezes, mostly from a smaller OOglie who couldn't hold theirs back..
 Rubber's Got Talent – in similar fashion to the " __ Got Talent" shows, a group of rubber contestants try to dazzle the judges (a crayon, a pair of scissors and a calculator) with incredible and wild stunts. It is only when they botch up their stunts that they actually impress the judges. The only exception was when a juggling rubber failed to impress them, it juggled their scorecards and changed the scores on them, to their chagrin.
 Strong Man Monkey Nut – a crazed monkeynut attempts at lifting various heavy objects, but only results in crashing his shell and allowing the smaller nuts inside to escape. 
 Mr Magnetic – a magnet donning sunglasses tries to escape anything metal around him, with little success.
 Whistle and Marshmallows – A busy blue whistle herds its flock of marshmallows (in the same style as a sheepdog with sheep), but one pink marshmallow constantly lets the rest of the flock escape its basket.
 Throughout Series 1, starting off in a frying pan, a string of sausages rockets along and around the house, using everything as a "tunnel" (a hosepipe, a drain) where it usually picks up an OOglie breakfast product (such as an egg, mushroom or bacon slice) whereupon they finish up as a breakfast meal on a plate, which is then taken by a human.
 A lightbulb tries to avoid being broken or get rid of minor nuisances.
 A French Maid Scrubbing Brush often deals with some of the messier OOglies when clearing up after their messes. In the penultimate episode, she comes across a sponge which she falls in love with.
 A piece of cheese "cries wolf" to be released from a mousetrap. Every time an OOglie helps him, they become trapped in the mousetrap as already planned. Although sometimes, the OOglies get their own back on the cheese.
 A hungry hoover suffers strange indigestion when consuming various objects or other OOglies.
 Pinky Glove – a bored, woolen glove helps out to various OOglies around the house.
 A French shoe "hunts" after a band of socks in order to make a meal out of them.
 Throughout Series 2, a line of clothes pegs fall, one by one, off their washing line by forces of nature. At the end of the series, it turns out they finish up in a washing basket.
 Three peas climb up a mountain of mashed potato and slide back down, often getting into trouble along the way.
 Petrified Pud – A nervous wreck of jelly is constantly scared witless by a mischievous pair of chocolate fingers (one milk and one white). At the end of the series, the jelly gets her own back on the fingers.
 Extreme Soap Bars – two bars of soap (one yellow, the other black) start from the bathroom and skid around in sporty fashion, finishing up from a long jump off the stair banisters. Usually, however, the yellow bar winds up landing in the most awkward of places – a coal bag, a litter tray, a birthday cake etc.
 A flourish camera takes photos of various OOglies characters, but is left exasperated when they mess up their shoots.
 Sal the Slice – a menacing Pizza Slicer creeps up on his unsuspecting victim in similar fashion to "Jaws" before slicing them up – whereupon the new slices come to life and attack him. In the final episode, he meets his match in the form of a larger pizza cutter, which saws off half the table.
 A tape measure tries to see how far he can run around the house, but whenever he recoils his tape due to some obstacle, he usually winds in an uncomfortable landing at the end; however, at the end of the series, 'Sal the Slice' cuts the tape, taking him with it instead of the tape measure.
 A trio of pound coins cause grief for a credit card whenever she tries to join in their games.
 The Battery Brothers – a pair of AAA batteries use various objects run on batteries to escape a larger, menacing 9-volt battery.
 The Duelling Toothbrushes – an orange manual toothbrush and a blue electric toothbrush constantly do battle to win the affection of a set of wind-up teeth, but eventually get too deep within their duels that they don't notice someone else taking the teeth's love.
 Clippy the Barber – an electric barber's razor gives haircuts to various OOglies, only to give them a ridiculous-looking style, resulting in his customer chasing him around the cupboard.
 Choccy Castle – a bag of jelly beans make constant attempts to raid a box of chocolates that antagonises them. In the last episode, they finally form a truce to have a dance.
 A pair of "rapper" mobile phones cause countless sleepless nights with their night-time malarkey on the desk.
 The Rock Band – a trio of rocks find an object that they use to make constant noise and music in the garden, but are silenced by an annoyed, elderly pine cone.
 The Intrepid Loo Roll – a strip of toilet paper makes endless attempts to escape the bathroom, but is usually caught by a human and used for cleaning before being flushed down the toilet, much to its disgust.
 A tiny ice cube, averse to cold temperatures, escapes to find warmer places to stay, such as a radiator, a kettle, etc.- but always melts every time.
 The Farty Pants – a group of pants play silly games around the household, with a pair of boxers often falling victim to their games.
 Action Hero Sock – an Indiana Jones-like sock tries many attempts to cross a pit full of belt snakes, but always fails, mirroring how the character of Indiana Jones is afraid of snakes.
 A hungry kitchen bin uses lures and objects to trick hapless OOglies into his waiting mouth which sometimes backfires.
 The Chilli Peppers – a band of wild chilli peppers runs rings around an unwitting OOglie food product and causes them to cook, with a lone chilli following and adding a "last touch". 
 The Makeup Makeover Crew – a group of female makeup assortments give surprise makeovers to various OOglies passing by their dressing up desk.
 The Sneaky Remote Control A sly remote control breaks the fourth wall by appearing in front of the various sketches and messing them up by changing the screen colour, the volume, the scenery or fast-forwarding, rewinding, and pausing the OOglies present.
 At the end of each show, a walnut strums a guitar (its base made up of various items) and whistles the OOglies theme as the credits are shown – only to be squashed, smashed, interrupted, etc. (This doesn't happen in the final episode (Season 2, Episode 13), where he is joined progressively by the Devious Blender, Sal the Slice, Melonhead, Bouncy Ball and the Playful Grapes in one final performance and a brief farewell to the audience.)
 Another common sketch involves household objects freaking out when they "react" – such as a telephone ringing, a toilet flushing, a TV changing channels.
 OOt-takes – exclusive to the CBBC website, this mini-series showcases a number of "bloopers" and "behind the scenes" footage when "filming" the OOglies and their various sketches.

Funsize

Potato Racers -
Pete Parsnip -
Fishing Finger-
Count Grape-ula -
Toast Soldiers -
Ninja Sushi -
Dr. Frankfurter -
Star Bar -
Cauliflower and Broccoli Wright -
Piggy Bank Robbers -
Apple Dropouts -
Dr. Rhu-barb -
Hottie the Hot Water Bottle -
Rival Chess Pieces -
Lemon Cleaners -
Dainty Meringue -
OOglies Talent Show – featured at the end of all Funsize episodes.

After each episode of the first two series is an internet reminder about the CBBC website: "Keep your eyes peeled for more OOglies, at bbc.co.uk/cbbc."

International Broadcast
USA
ABC (2009–2011)
NBC (2010–2012)
ABC Family (2013–2015)
Malaysia
TV3 (2012–2013)
TV9 (2013–2014)
NTV7 (2016–2017)
Indonesia
MNCTV (2011–2013)
Spacetoon (2014–2019)
RTV (2019–2020)
Japan
Animax (2012–2013)
South Korea
EBS Kids (2019–2020)
France
Canal+ (2018–2020)
India
Zee Kids (2014–2019)

DVD release
A DVD release of the series containing a select number of episodes was released by Classic Media and Universal Studios Home Entertainment UK in 2010, under license from the BBC.

References 

"Leading team of animators come together to create OOglies, a new comedy for CBBC made by BBC Scotland", BBC Press Office, BBC, 26 March 2009. Retrieved 20 August 2009.

External links 

2009 British television series debuts
BBC children's television shows
British stop-motion animated television series
Television series by BBC Studios